Andreas Clemens (born May 5, 1966 in Hildesheim) is a German physician. He is an internist, endocrinologist and diabetologist. His main interest is the investigation and development of drugs in the field of cardiology, endocrinology, ophthalmology and very rare diseases.

Life and work 
As part of his scientific activities, he has published more than 130 peer-reviewed articles. He has an H-index of 42. He is a member of the European Association for Vision and Eye Research Foundation. He is also an associate editor (editor) at Contemporary Clinical Trials. Furthermore, he is actively involved in teaching at the Albert Ludwigs University of Freiburg, Germany.

References

1966 births
Living people
German physicians